Chernooki is a village of Krumovgrad Municipality, in Kardzhali Province, southern Bulgaria.

References

Villages in Kardzhali Province